Ruby-plsql-spec is a modern PL/SQL unit testing framework, based on the Ruby testing (or behaviour driven development) framework.

It was originally developed to give PL/SQL developers an alternative to the utPLSQL framework. The goal was to make it faster to write Unit testing easier and less verbose.

References

Unit testing frameworks